Erion Veliaj (born December 17, 1979) is an Albanian, politician, who is currently serving as the Mayor of Tirana. Stemming from a civil society activism organization as the leader of MJAFT!, Veliaj joined the ranks of the Socialist Party of Albania in 2011, when he was appointed Secretary for Youth and Immigration.

Previously he has served as a Member of the Parliament for the district of Gjirokastër and as Minister of Social Welfare and Youth under Prime Minister Edi Rama.
In April 2015, Veliaj was appointed as mayoral candidate of the Socialist Party in the city of Tirana. He won the elections and took office on July 31, 2015.

Personal life and education
Erion Veliaj was born on December 17, 1979, in Tirana, Albania. His father Luan Veliaj served as an officer in the Albanian Army, while his mother was an HR Manager in the military. He attended the Sami Frashëri High School in Tirana and then later Grand Valley State University in Allendale, Michigan where he graduated with a B.A. in political science. He received his master's degree in European Integration from the University of Sussex. Before returning to Albania, Veliaj worked with several international humanitarian organizations in the Americas, Eastern Africa, and Kosovo.

Veliaj is from a Muslim family which first left Islam and later became an atheist. Getting in contact with missionaries from the United States, Erion Veliaj converted to Evangelicalism. His Mjaft organisation showed the controversial Muhammad cartoons on its pages.
On April 30, 2017, as Mayor of Tirana, Erion Veliaj received “Doctor Honoris Causa” extended by the Grand Valley State University in the US for the contribution made in public services.

He is married and has a son.

Political career

MJAFT! 
Veliaj was one of the earliest activists of MJAFT!, a civic organization created in 2003 aimed at protesting social and political injustices in Albania. He soon became one of the central figures of MJAFT! due to his many TV appearances. Veliaj was involved with MJAFT! until November 2007. Mjaft organization showed the controversial Muhammad cartoons on its pages when Veliaj was a leader of it.
In 2004, ‘MJAFT!’ was granted the United Nations Award for Civil Society by Kofi Annan for its exemplary and highly efficient methods of protest.

G99 
In 2008, Erion Veliaj and a few other activists from MJAFT! created G99 (Group 99), a center-left political party. While initially unaligned, G99 ended up joining other political parties of the center-left coalition in the 2009 Parliamentary Election. Erion Veliaj ran as G99's leading candidate for the district of Tirana. Despite the media attention, Erion Veliaj and G99 only earned 0.86% of the vote, failing to win a seat in the Parliament. In 2011, Veliaj leaves G99 and joins the Socialist Party of Albania.

Socialist Party of Albania
In the Socialist Party, Veliaj was nominated to serve as Secretary for Youth and Emigration. In 2013, he was nominated as a candidate for MP representing the district of Gjirokastër. The center-left coalition of political parties won the 2013 Parliamentary Election and Veliaj was appointed to serve as Minister of Social Welfare and Youth in Edi Rama's new cabinet. He resigned in 2015 due to him being nominated as SPA's candidate for Mayor of Tirana. Veliaj was elected Mayor of Tirana with 53.58% of the vote, defeating Democratic Party's candidate, Halim Kosova and the independent candidate, Gjergj Bojaxhi.

Mayor of Tirana

Tirana Mayoral Election 2015 
In April 2015, Veliaj was appointed as mayoral candidate of the Socialist Party in the city of Tirana. The candidate representing the oppositional Democratic Party was Halim Kosova, a well-known gynecologist, serving as a Member of Parliament at the time. Other candidates were Gjergj Bojaxhi, a former Democratic politician, and Sazan Guri, an environmental activist. Veliaj won the elections by a landslide and took office on July 31, 2015.

Mayoral tenure 
The issue of urban air pollution is a growing concern in Tirana, and the role of the car can be controversial. In September 2015, Tirana organized its first vehicle-free day. In January 2017 the new Skanderbeg Square was inaugurated by Veliaj and the Prime Minister. In July 2017 the Municipality of Tiranë voted to raise the water tariff significantly, Veliaj promoted this action by arguing that it would eventually make drinking water available 24 hours a day, and help improve its access and quality. During his term as Mayor, he has earned the nickname "Lali Eri", which can be translated as "Big Brother Eri"

Notable projects of the Municipality of Tirana
 Reja (the cloud), a project from Sou Fujimoto.
 Plastic bags reduction project
 Skanderbeg Square - featured also as one of the installations at the 2017 Chicago Architecture Biennial.
 Pazari i Ri, in an urban renewal project, the "New Bazaar" neighbourhood was rebuilt.

Controversies

Death of Ardit Gjoklaj 
Ardit Gjoklaj, a 17-year-old boy died on 7 August 2016 working in very poor conditions in the landfill of Sharrë. His death became controversial because the company that managed the landfill of Sharrë "3R", was promoted publicly by Veliaj himself as having good working conditions.

Comments about injured police officer 
On 27 November 2018, in a televised speech to the City Council, Veliaj reacted to the developing story about a police officer who lost her fingers in clashes with protesters in Tirana, by saying "We are all men here. Would any of us have eyes to marry someone with no fingers?"

Demolition of the National Theatre
Amidst the protests against the construction of a new National Theatre building replacing the old National Theatre in Tirana, on 8 May 2020 the Albanian government transferred ownership of the land of the National Theatre to the Tirana Municipality through a special law. This law emphasized that the land must be used only for the construction of a new theatre building.

After more than two years of consecutive protests for the protection of National theatre and after a dubious legal procedure, the building was demolished on Sunday 17 May 2020 by police bulldozers with heavy police presence  at 4:30 in the morning. This action took place during the emergency state in Albania due to COVID-19 pandemic.

This decision drew the widespread condemnation from several local activists, opposition political parties and artists against the Municipality of Tirana and the Albanian government. Europa Nostra called the demolition of the theatre as illegal and against the rule of law. The Delegation of EU in Albania voiced their concern regarding the lack of dialogue between the authorities and activists before the demolition took place.

References

External links
Portraits – Return to Europe: Erion Veliaj, Albania
The Albanian Renaissance Documentary

1979 births
Living people
Members of the Parliament of Albania
Government ministers of Albania
Youth ministers of Albania
Mayors of Tirana
Converts to evangelical Christianity
Albanian former Muslims
Converts to Protestantism from Islam
Albanian evangelicals
Former Muslims turned agnostics or atheists
Converts to Protestantism from atheism or agnosticism
Socialist Party of Albania politicians
Grand Valley State University alumni
Alumni of the University of Sussex